Tony Passander (born August 29, 1948) was a Canadian football player who played for the Montreal Alouettes. He won the Grey Cup with them in 1970. He previously played college football at The Citadel, The Military College of South Carolina in Charleston.

References

1948 births
Living people
Montreal Alouettes players
American football quarterbacks
Canadian football quarterbacks
The Citadel Bulldogs football players
American players of Canadian football
People from Derby, Connecticut
Players of American football from Connecticut